Francisco Paulo Mignone (September 3, 1897, São Paulo – February 19, 1986, Rio de Janeiro) was one of the most significant figures in Brazilian classical music, and one of the most significant Brazilian composers after Heitor Villa-Lobos. In 1968 he was chosen as Brazilian composer of the year.

Life and career
A graduate of the São Paulo Conservatory and then of the Milan Conservatory, Mignone returned to São Paulo in 1929 to teach harmony, and in 1933 took a post in Rio de Janeiro at the Escola Nacional de Música. Mignone was a versatile composer, dividing his output nearly evenly between solo songs, piano pieces, chamber instrumental works, orchestral works, and choral works. In addition, he wrote five operas and eight ballets.

Son of the Italian immigrant flutist Alferio Mignone, Francisco was already making his mark upon the musical world of Brazil by the time he was 10 years old, gaining notoriety around his district playing in the choro style. A pianist and orchestra leader at 13, he had gained some fame composing and playing under the pseudonym of Chico Bororó, keeping these activities separate from his formal music training.  His works may be divided into three compositional periods. His early works show the Italian influences and Romantic sensibilities of his training in Milan. An orchestral piece from his first opera of this early period was premiered in Rio de Janeiro by Richard Strauss conducting the Vienna Philharmonic Orchestra, in 1923.
	
Much of Mignone's music is strongly nationalistic in flavor; influenced by the nationalistic movement of his former schoolmate and teacher, the musicologist and writer Mário de Andrade, Mignone uses the folk and popular melodies and forms of his native Brazil as a basis for his compositions. (Andrade reportedly said, "In Italian music, Mignone will be one more among a rich and numerous school, to which he does not add anything. Here, he will be of indispensable value.") From 1929 until 1960 his work was most strongly characterized by this nationalism, during which he composed such pieces as the Fantasias Brasileiras and his ballets Maracatu do Chico Rei and Leilão. His solo vocal and piano works of this time earned him particular acclaim for their expression of Brazilian musical styles, such as the choro, the modinha, and the valsas (waltzes) reminiscent of strolling serenaders.

Mignone's music is noted for its lyricism, colorful instrumentation, and improvisatory style. Most of his early works are tonal, as is typical of the popular and folk music, though later in his career he branched out into polytonal, atonal, and serial writing. In the late 1950s Mignone drifted away from the nationalistic music and toward the then-current trends in academic concert music, composing works such as his 1958 Piano Concerto, which showcase his skillful instrumentation and bravura writing. Mignone was capable of writing in a variety of styles and his works of the early 1960s and beyond are noted for their eclecticism; it is difficult to find any other unifying feature. However, he returned to nationalistic writing toward his last few years.

Mignone was married with Liddy Chiafarelli Mignone who died in a plane crash in 1962 and after that married with Maria Josephina Mignone with whom he frequently played duets.

Mignone died in Rio de Janeiro, age 88. His wife remains an interpreter of his music to this day.

Notable works
O contratador de diamantes, opera, 1921
Congada (from O contratador), orchestra, 1921
L'innocente, opera, 1928
Seis líricas, vocal, 1932
Maracatu do Chico Rei, ballet, 1933
Variações sobre um tema brasileiro, cello and orchestra, 1935
Fantasias brasileiras nos.1–4, piano and orchestra, 1929-1936
Babaloxá, orchestra, 1936
Mizú, operetta, 1937
Quatro líricas, vocal, 1938
Festa das igrejas, orchestra, 1940
Leilão, ballet, 1941
O espantalho, ballet, 1941
Iara, ballet, 1942
Pousa a mão na minha testa, vocal, 1942
Valsas de esquina nos.1–12, piano, 1938–43
O guarda chuva, ballet, 1953
Valsas choros 1–12, piano, 1946–55
Piano Concerto, 1958
Tres Valsas Brasileiras (1968) Viola e Piano
Sugestões sinfônicas, tone poem-ballet, 1969
Doze Estudos, guitar, 1970
12 Valsas para Violão , guitar, 1970
Variações em busca de um tema, orchestra, 1972
O chalaça, opera, 1973
O sargento de milícias, opera, 1978
Quincas Berro d'Agua, ballet, 1979
Valsa brasileira nos.4–12, piano, 1979
O Caçador de esmeraldas, ballet, 1980
16 valsas para fagote solo, bassoon, 1982

Recordings
Francisco Mignone: 12 Studies for Guitar (Da Vinci C00614), played by Cyro Delvizio

References
Gerard Béhague: "Francisco Mignone". Grove Music Online, accessed 28 Feb 05.
The Solo Piano Music of Francisco Mignone and Camargo Guarnieri by Marion Verhaalen (1974)

External links
About Francisco Mignone (with MIDI scores)
Fantasia Brasileira no. 4 performed by Alexandra Mascolo-David and the Kalamazoo Symphony Orchestra on WGBH
Amy Suzanne Gillick, "Experimentation and Nationalism in Francisco Mignone's Works for Bassoon : a Performance Guide to the IInd Wind Quintet and Concertino". Dissertation, UCLA, 2008.

1897 births
1986 deaths
Brazilian classical composers
Brazilian male composers
20th-century classical composers
Brazilian opera composers
Brazilian people of Italian descent
Milan Conservatory alumni
Musicians from São Paulo
Male classical composers
20th-century Brazilian musicians
20th-century male musicians